The 2009 Canoe Sprint European Championships were held in Brandenburg, Germany.

Medal overview
Source:

Men

Women

Medal table

References

External links
 European Canoe Association

Canoe Sprint European Championships
Canoe Sprint
2009 in canoeing
Canoeing and kayaking competitions in Germany